Thomas Hürlimann (born 21 December 1950) is a Swiss playwright and novelist.

Biography
Hürlimann was born in Zug, Switzerland. He is a son of the former government and federal councilor (Minister) Hans Hürlimann. He studied philosophy in Zürich and Berlin, worked as an assistant director and dramaturge at the Berlin Schiller Theater and was a guest lecturer at the German Institute for Literature in Leipzig. His 1989 novel Das Gartenhaus was published as The Couple in the United States in 1991. His works have been translated into 21 languages.

Works
Selected works include:

Prosa
 Die Tessinerin (1981), 
 Das Gartenhaus (1989), 
 Die Satellitenstadt (1992), 
 Carleton (1996)
 Das Holztheater (1997), 
 Die Lawine (1998)
 Himmelsöhi, hilf! Über die Schweiz und andere Nester (2002), 
 Vierzig Rosen (2006), 
 Der Sprung in den Papierkorb. Geschichten, Gedanken und Notizen am Rand (2008), 
 Dämmerschoppen. Geschichten aus 30 Jahren (2009), 
 Nietzsches Regenschirm. (2015), 
 Heimkehr (2018), 
 Der rote Diamant (2022),

Theater
 Grossvater und Halbbruder (1981)
 Der letzte Gast (1990)
 Der Gesandte (1991)
 De Franzos im Ybrig (1991)
 Güdelmäntig (1993)
 Fräulein Stark (2001)
 Vierzig Rosen (2006)
 Der Sprung in den Papierkorb (2008)

Awards
 1981 Aspekte-Literaturpreis for Die Tessinerin
 1992 Marieluise-Fleisser-Preis
 1997 Literaturpreis der Konrad-Adenauer-Stiftung
 1998 Solothurner Literaturpreis
 2001 Joseph Breitbach Prize
 2007 Schillerpreis
 2008 Caroline-Schlegel-Preis
 2011 Thomas Mann Prize
 2014 Alemannischer Literaturpreis
 2019 Gottfried-Keller-Preis

Honorary doctorates
 2016 University of Basel

Memberships
 Member of the Bayerische Akademie der Schönen Künste
 Member of the Deutsche Akademie für Sprache und Dichtung
 Member of the Academy of Arts, Berlin

References

External links
 
Thomas Hürlimann: New German dramatic art. Goethe-Instituts Website

1950 births
Living people
People from Zug
Swiss writers in German
Members of the Academy of Arts, Berlin